August 32nd on Earth (and also known as 32nd Day of August on Earth) is a 1998 Canadian drama film directed and written by Denis Villeneuve, in his feature film directorial debut, and produced by Roger Frappier. It was screened in the Un Certain Regard section at the 1998 Cannes Film Festival. Alexis Martin won the Prix Jutra for Best Actor. The film was selected as the Canadian entry for the Best Foreign Language Film at the 71st Academy Awards, but was not nominated.

Plot 
In the aftermath of a highway mishap, photo model Simone (Pascale Bussières) decides that conceiving a baby with her best friend Philippe (Alexis Martin) is the only way to give her vacant life some meaning. Philippe reluctantly agrees with the proviso that they conceive in a desert.

Cast

Reception 
Brendan Kelly of Variety praised the film's visuals, the lead performances, the "sparing but effective" use of musical tracks by Quebec icons Robert Charlebois and Jean Leloup, but Kelly criticized the "thin" storyline, saying it "simply doesn't have the goods to keep audiences interested over the long-haul." Timeout equally praised the striking visuals, but called the film "an intriguing but only partly successful oddity...never really adding up to very much at all." Reelfilm.com gave the film two out of four stars, saying it was "a sporadically intriguing yet mostly self-indulgent first film from a director who would go onto much better things."

See also
 List of submissions to the 71st Academy Awards for Best Foreign Language Film
 List of Canadian submissions for the Academy Award for Best Foreign Language Film

References

External links
 

1998 films
1998 drama films
Canadian drama films
English-language Canadian films
Films directed by Denis Villeneuve
1998 directorial debut films
French-language Canadian films
1990s Canadian films